The Governor of Anguilla is the representative of the monarch in the British Overseas Territory of Anguilla. The Governor is appointed by the monarch on the advice of the British government. The Governor is the highest authority on Anguilla, but daily business is handled by local Anguillan elected officials. The main role of the Governor is to appoint the Premier of Anguilla.

The Governor's official residence is Government House at Old Ta. The Governor has her own flag: the Union Flag defaced with the Coat of Arms of Anguilla.

The current Governor is Dileeni Daniel-Selvaratnam, who was sworn in on 18 January 2021.

List of governors of Anguilla
1982–83: Charles Henry Godden
1983–87: Alastair Turner Baillie
1987–89: Geoffrey Owen Whittaker
1989–92: Brian George John Canty
1992–95: Alan William Shave
1995–96: Alan Hoole
1996–2000: Robert Harris
2000–04: Peter Johnstone
2004–06: Alan Huckle
2006–09: Andrew George
2009–13: Alistair Harrison
2013–17: Christina Scott
2017–20: Tim Foy
2021–: Dileeni Daniel-Selvaratnam

See also

List of colonial governors and administrators of Anguilla

References

External links

 Government of Anguilla – H.E. The Governor

Government of Anguilla
 
Anguilla-related lists
Anguilla